Qhapaq Qulla (Quechua qhapaq noble, principal, mighty; Qulla an indigenous people) is a folk dance in Peru. It is performed at festivals of the Cusco Region, such as Mamacha Carmen in Paucartambo and the important Quyllur Rit'i at the Winter Solstice on the mountain Qullqipunku.

See also 
 Ch'unchu
 Qhapaq negro
 Saqra

References 

Peruvian dances
Native American dances
Cusco Region